Imre Varga (19 August 1945 – 18 September 2011) was a Hungarian judoka. He competed at the 1972 (where he was defeated by Canadian Terry Farnsworth, and came in 19th), 1976, and the 1980 Summer Olympics.

References

External links
 

1945 births
2011 deaths
Hungarian male judoka
Olympic judoka of Hungary
Judoka at the 1972 Summer Olympics
Judoka at the 1976 Summer Olympics
Judoka at the 1980 Summer Olympics
Sportspeople from Békés County
20th-century Hungarian people